North Queensferry railway station is a railway station in the village of North Queensferry, Fife, Scotland.

History 
Although the station was not in service by the time of the opening of the Forth Bridge in March 1890, it was opened on 1 July 1890. The station replaced the station at North Queensferry Pier, which had been opened in 1877 to take passengers to and from the ferry across the Forth.

The station has been unstaffed since 1990, following the closure of its ticket office. The original wooden Victorian station building is still standing and its design is unique to the area.

To celebrate the Forth Bridge Centenary in 1990, a large mosaic depicting the bridge and the local area, created entirely by local residents, was unveiled at the station on Platform 2. The mosaic is now a well-known landmark on the Fife Circle line.

Services 

Four trains per hour head towards northbound  and the Fife Circle.

Evenings and Sundays two trains per hour go to Edinburgh Waverley and two along the Fife Circle, one via Dunfermline and the other via .

References

Railway stations in Fife
Former Forth Bridge Railway stations
Railway stations in Great Britain opened in 1890
Railway stations served by ScotRail
1890 establishments in Scotland